Pakistan has many traditional games and sports. Many of them are similar to the traditional South Asian games played in countries such as India and Bangladesh.

Traditional games

Gilli Danda 

Gilli Danda revolves around players taking turns to use one stick to hit another stick as far as possible, while trying not to allow the other team to catch the airborne stick before it touches the ground.

Kite-flying 

There is a tradition of flying kites (also known as Patang Bazi) in Pakistan, especially during Basant. In some cases, participants competitively attempt to fly their kites in such a way as to cut the strings of other kites.

Pittu Garam 

In Pittu Garam, one team throws a ball at a pile of seven stones and then attempts to put them back up as fast as possible, while the other team can throw the ball at players of the first team to eliminate them.

Marbles 
Marbles, also known as bilori or shinoli in Pashto, is a family of games involving marbles.

Chindro 
Chindro or Cheendro is a game similar to hopscotch, in which participants attempt to move a rock all the way through a series of connected boxes while hopping on one foot.

Tackling games

Malakhra 

Two competitors attempt to wrestle one another to the ground while only holding onto each others' waistcloths.

Yanda 
Yanda (also known as Yenda, Yandu, etc.) is a game of Khyber Pakhtunkhwa in which the teams take turns sending one of their players to run around a circle, while two opponents attempt to make the runner fall before he can run around the entire circle and safely make it back to his teammates. Players who are made to fall are eliminated from the game. The game ends once one team has all of its players eliminated, with the other team then winning the game.

Variations of tag

Kabaddi 
Kabaddi involves two teams alternating offense and defense, with one offensive player stepping across a dividing line, attempting to tag as many opponents as possible within a limited amount of time, and then making it back over the line without being tackled in order to score points.

Kho-kho 
Kho-kho is a traditional team game that involves nine players on the offensive team taking turns to try to tag out three defensive players.

Baraf Paani 

Players become frozen in place when tagged by an opponent, but are unfrozen by the touch of a teammate.

Oonch Neech

Langri Pala 

Players attempt to tag opponents while hopping on one foot.

Jee 

Jee is a traditional Balochi game in which one team attempts to send one player at a time from one area to another without being tagged out by the opponents.

Board games

Carrom 
Carrom is a game with similarities to air hockey and billiards/pool, where players flick a puck using their fingers from their own side of the four-sided board in order to impact other pieces on the board.

Events involving animals

Chirpiest Partridge 
Various caged partridges are placed next to each other, with the chirpiest of them winning the day's contest.

References 

Traditional sports of Pakistan